Mind your own business is a common English saying. 

Mind your own business may also refer to:

 Mind Your Own Business (film), a 1936 American comedy film
 "Mind Your Own Business" (TSR episode), an episode of the American television sitcom That's So Raven
 "Mind Your Own Business" (song), a 1949 song by Hank Williams
 Soleirolia soleirolii, also known as mind-your-own-business, a herb of the nettle family
 "Mind Your Own Business", a song by Living Colour from their 1993 album Stain
 "Mind Your Own Business", a song by Delta 5, covered by Chicks on Speed, Le Shok and Pigface
 Mind Your Own Business, album by Henry McCullough
 Mind Your Own Business: The Battle for Personal Privacy, a 1995 book by Gini Graham Scott

See also
 Mind your business (disambiguation)
 MYOB (disambiguation)
 Mine Your Own Business; a 2006 film